Peter Farmer (26 October 1886 – 4 September 1964) was a Scottish professional football manager active throughout Europe in the 1920s and 1930s.

Career
Farmer coached French teams Marseille (1923–1924) and Racing Club de France (1933–1934). He had a second spell at Marseille (1930-1931) and also coached Racing Club de France (1933–1934) and Stella Cherbourg.

Farmer was also in charge of Italian side Torino between 1924 and 1926, coached the France national team at the 1928 Summer Olympics. He was later a trainer at Celtic (1929-1930) and manager of Tunbridge Wells Rangers (1934).

in November 1934 he was appointed as Romania's national team coach but never led the team in any official match, leaving in May 1935.

References

Scottish football managers
Expatriate football managers in France
Expatriate football managers in Italy
Expatriate football managers in Romania
Olympique de Marseille managers
Torino F.C. managers
Racing Club de France Football managers
Celtic F.C. non-playing staff
Scottish expatriate football managers
Scottish expatriate sportspeople in France
Scottish expatriate sportspeople in Italy
Scottish expatriate sportspeople in Romania
France national football team managers
Romania national football team managers
Footballers from West Dunbartonshire
1886 births
1964 deaths
People from Renton, West Dunbartonshire